The Namdang Stone Bridge is a historic bridge located a few kilometers away from Sibsagar town in Assam, India. It was constructed in 1703 by craftmen brought from Bengal during the reign of Ahom king Rudra Singha. It runs over the Namdang (Tai-Ahom : Nam= Water; Dang=Red) river, a tributary of the Dikhou river. The present National Highway 37 is passing over it. The unique characteristic of the bridge is that it was cut out from a single solid piece of rock hundred years of age.

The bridge is a little curved in shape. The bridge connects Sibsagar town to Jorhat and other districts in the west.

History 
King Pratap Singha built a town on its bank and much later Rudra Singha constructed a masonry bridge over it. According to Peter Wade, the Namdang bridge was regarded as the western gate of the military capital of Rangpur, and was capable of being rendered a post of great strength, as the Moamoria rebels experienced. Many battles were fought  in the vicinity during the reign of Gaurinath Singha and the Moamaria rebels. In 1825 a decisive battle took place  between the British and Burmese in the bank of the Namdang river.

See also
List of bridges in India

References

External links
Namdang Xaku by Kharkhuwa

Sivasagar
Bridges in Assam
Stone arch bridges
Ahom kingdom
Transport in Sibsagar